The 2018–19 American Athletic Conference men's basketball season began with practices in October 2018 followed by the start of the 2018–19 NCAA Division I men's basketball season in November. The conference held its media day in October 2018. Conference play began in December 2018 and concluded in March 2019.

Head coaches

Coaching changes 
UConn hired former Rhode Island and Wagner coach Dan Hurley after firing Kevin Ollie following his sixth season as head coach. 
Memphis fired Tubby Smith after 2 seasons and replaced him with alum Penny Hardaway. 
East Carolina head coach Jeff Lebo resigned 6 games into the 2017–18 season and was succeeded on an interim basis by assistant coach Michael Perry. After the season, the school hired former Florida Gulf Coast head coach Joe Dooley, who previously served as head coach of the team from 1995-99.

Coaches 

Notes:
 Overall and AAC records are from time at current school and are through the end of 2018–19 season. NCAA records include time at current school only.
 AAC records only, prior conference records not included.

Preseason

Preseason Coaches Poll 
The American Coaches poll was released on October 15, 2018, with UCF predicted to finish first in the AAC.

Preseason All-AAC Teams

Regular season

Rankings

Conference matrix 
This table summarizes the head-to-head results between teams in conference play. Each team will play 18 conference games: one game vs. four opponents and two games against seven opponents.

Player of the week
Throughout the regular season, the American Athletic Conference named a player and rookie of the week.

Honors and awards

All-AAC Awards and Teams
* Unanimous Selection

Postseason

American Athletic Conference tournament

NCAA Tournament 

The winner of the AAC tournament, Cincinnati, received the conference's automatic bid to the NCAA Tournament.

NIT 

Memphis and Wichita State received at-large bids to the NIT.

CBI 

South Florida received an at-large bid to the CBI.

NBA Draft 
No AAC players were drafted in the 2019 NBA draft.

References